Didier Haudepin (born 15 August 1951) is a French actor, film producer, director and screenwriter. He has appeared in 44 films and television shows, and plays since 1960. His film Those Were the Days was screened in the Un Certain Regard section at the 1995 Cannes Film Festival. He is most well known for his lead role in Les amitiés particulières, the film adaptation of the eponymous novel by Roger Peyrefitte, as Alexandre Motier.

Selected filmography
 Seven Days... Seven Nights (1960)
 Les amitiés particulières (1964)
 The Uninhibited (1965)
 Cotolay (1966)
 Promise at Dawn (1970)
 A Time for Loving (1971)
 L'innocente (1976)
 No Trifling with Love (1977)
 Those Were the Days (1995 – directed)

References

Bibliography
 Holmstrom, John. The Moving Picture Boy: An International Encyclopaedia from 1895 to 1995. Norwich, Michael Russell, 1996, p. 293.

External links

1951 births
Living people
French male film actors
French male television actors
French film producers
French male screenwriters
French screenwriters
French film directors
Male actors from Paris